Errol Palmer (born 1945) is a retired professional basketball small forward who played one season in the American Basketball Association (ABA) as a member of the Minnesota Muskies (1967–68). He attended DePaul University.

External links
 

1945 births
Living people
Basketball players from Chicago
DePaul Blue Demons men's basketball players
Minnesota Muskies players
Small forwards
American men's basketball players